The 1860 Connecticut gubernatorial election was held on April 2, 1860. Incumbent governor and Republican nominee William Alfred Buckingham defeated former governor and Democratic nominee Thomas H. Seymour with 50.30% of the vote.

General election

Candidates
Major party candidates

William Alfred Buckingham, Republican
Thomas H. Seymour, Democratic

Results

References

1860
Connecticut
Gubernatorial